Bakshi Stadium is a stadium in Wazir Bagh, Srinagar, Kashmir. It is mainly used for football matches. The capacity of the stadium is 45,000. The stadium is able to host highest-standard matches, including some of Real Kashmir FC in the I-League.

It is one of the biggest football stadiums in state and country. As per FIFA norms, stadium would be developed to world-class facility with the budget of ₹44 crore.

References

Football venues in Jammu and Kashmir
Sport in Srinagar
Sports venues in Jammu and Kashmir
Year of establishment missing